James M. Carrington (April 17, 1904 – January 28, 1995) was a photographer and Democratic politician who served in the Missouri House of Representatives. Born in St. Louis, Missouri, he was first elected to the Missouri House of Representatives in 1972. In 1925, he graduated from Howard University with a degree in electrical engineering. Carrington was the first African-American photographer for the St. Louis Globe-Democrat and the first African-American to represent St. Louis County in the Missouri House of Representatives.

References

Members of the Missouri House of Representatives
1904 births
1995 deaths
20th-century American politicians